Yekaterina Fesenko (born August 8, 1958) is a Russian athlete who competed for the USSR. She was born in Krasnodar. After her marriage in 1992, she appeared in the charts under the name of Yekaterina Grun or Yekaterina Fesenko-Grun.

Career

Fesenko was USSR champion 400 meter hurdles starting in 1980.  In the 1982 European Championships, she placed seventh in 55.86.  In 1983, she won titles in the 400m hurdles and as part of the Soviet 4 x 400 meter relay team at the Universiade.  Later that season, at the inaugural 1983 World Championships in Athletics she won the title in 54.14, one hundredth of a second ahead of her compatriot Ana Ambrazienė, who had previously set the world record at 54.02 in June of that year.

In 1984 she was unable to compete in the Olympics because of the Soviet led 1984 Summer Olympics boycott.

Personal bests
 400m: 52.26 (1980)
 400m Hurdles: 54.14 (1983)

References

1958 births
Living people
Soviet female hurdlers
World Athletics Championships medalists
Russian female hurdlers
Universiade medalists in athletics (track and field)
Universiade gold medalists for the Soviet Union
World Athletics Championships winners
Medalists at the 1983 Summer Universiade
Friendship Games medalists in athletics